A charter of incorporation was granted to "New Royal African Company" on 27 Sept 1672 by Charles II, superseding the "Company of Royal Adventurers trading into Africa", chartered on 10 January 1663.  The following list of officers and shareholders ("subscribers") is taken from the charter of incorporation.

Officers 

 James Duke of York (later King James II)
 Anthony Earl of Shaftesbury
 John Buckworth
 Sir John Banks
 John Bence, Esq.
 William Earl of Craven
 Jarvis Cartwright
 Samuel Dashwood
 Sir Richard Ford
 Thomas Farrington
 Capt. Ferdinando Gorges
 Edward Hopegood
 John Jeffreys
 Sir Andrew King
 Charles Modyford, Esq.
 Samuel Moyer
 Peter Proby
 Gabriel Roberts
 Sir John Shaw
 Benjamin Skutt
 Sir Robert Vyner
 Thomas Vernon
 Nicholas Warren
 Richard Young

Founding Shareholders 
(Note: "shareholder" is a relatively modern term.  At the time of the charter, shareholders were called "subscribers".)

 James Duke of York (later King James II)
 Prince Rupert
 Anthony Earl of Shaftesbury
 Henry Earl of Arlington
 Col. William Ashburnham
 Alderman Robert Ask
 John Ashby
 John Ayres
 Thomas Aldworth
 Russell Alsop
 Richard Alic
 Thomas Andrewes
 Duke of Buckingham
 John Earl of Bath
 George Lord Berkley of Berkley
 Sir John Banks
 Sir Thomas Blodworth
 John Ball
 John Bence, Esq.
 Richard Booth
 John Buckworth
 James Burkin
 John Bull
 Mrs. Dorcas Birkhead
 Edmond Bostock
 Richard Beckford
 Anthony Barnardiston
 Joas Bateman
 Edward Bouvery
 Man Browne
 John Beare
 Richard Boys
 John Bowerman
 William Bowman
 John Bowles
 Thos. Lord Clifford
 William Earl of Craven
 Sir George Carteret
 Sir William Coventry
 Sir Anthony Craven
 Sir Robert Cotton
 Sir Peter Colleton
 Sir Nicholas Crispe
 Sir Francis Chaplin
 Sir Robert Clayton
 Mrs. Dorothy Colvill
 Capt. George Cock
 Benjamin Coles
 John Crispe, Esq.
 Thomas Crispe
 Nicholas Cook
 Jarvis Cartwright
 John Culling
 Josia Childe
 Thomas Childe
 Nicholas Carter
 Benjamin Cole 
 John Cooke
 Sir Jonathan Dawes
 George Dashwood, Esq.
 Alderman Francis Dashwood
 William Dashwood
 Samuel Dashwood
 George Day
 Thomas Duck
 Humphrey Edwin
 Samuel Everard
 Sir Richard Ford
 Sir Philip Frowd
 Alderman Daniel Forth
 John Fenn
 Thomas Farington
 George Frohock
 John Fitch
 Moses Goodyer
 Capt. Ferdinando Gorges
 Henry Griffith
 William Goulston
 John Gardner
 Philip Grave
 Willaim Galway
 Robt. Jeffreys
 John Gourney
 Francis Lord Hawley
 James Hoare (senior)
 Edward Hopegood
 William Hodges
 John Hill
 John Harbin
 Ralph Hodgkins
 Thomas Heatley
 Richard Holder
 Richard Hawkins
 George Hadley
 Rowland Hill
 James Hoare (junior)
 Henry Johnson
 John Jeffreys 
 John Jurin
 Peter Joy
 Thomas Johnson
 Marke Jarvis
 Sir Andrew King
 George Keats 
 Henry Kempe
 Sir Charles Littleton
 Sir John Lowther
 Christopher Lowther
 Thomas Lewis
 John Lindsey
 Simon Lewis
 John Letten
 Jacob Lucy
 William Levell
 Ralph Lee
 Henry Lascee
 John Locke
 Charles Modyford
 Richard Middleton
 Marke Mortimer
 John Middleton
 Robert Morris
 Daniel Mercer
 Humphrey Morrice
 John Morrice
 Thomas Murthwaite
 Samuel Moyer
 Ralph Marshall
 John Meade
 John Markland
 John Morgan
 Robert Monteth
 Wm. Metcalfe
 Thomas Neales
 Benjamin Newland
 Thomas Nicholls 
  Richard Nicol
 Mrs. Delicia Nelson
 William Lord Powis
 Sr. Thomas Player
 Lawrence du Puy
 Charles Porter
 Thomas Povey
 John Portman
 Peter Proby
 Daniel Pennington 
 Peter Paravicini
 Sir John Robinson
 Dame Priscilla Rider
 Tobias Rustal
 William Rosse of Rosse Island
 Thomas Rider
 William Rider
 William Roberts
 Robert Ryves
 Gabriel Roberts
 Henry Richards
 Edward Rudge
 Godfrey Richards
 Charles Ryves
 Sir John Shaw
 Col. John Searle
 Sir John Smith
 Benjamin Skutt
 Joseph Skutt
 William Salmon
 Samuel Sambrooke
 Peter Short
 Robert Stevenson
 William Stevens
 John Short
 Thomas Short
 John Sweeting
 Simon Smith
 John Skepper
 Thomas Stevens
 Nathaniel Symons
 Edmond Sherman
  Shermer
 Sir John Talbott
 Henry Tulce
 George Toriano
 Samuel Terrell
 Paul Tatnell
 Sir Robert Vyner
 Thomas Vernon
 William Vannam
 Sir George Waterman
 Sir Thomas Wolstenholme
 Sir William Warren
 Brome Whorwood
 Sir Joseph Williamson
 Thomas Winter
 Edward Willoughby
 William Walker
 Nicholas Warren 
 William Warren
 Arnold White
 John Winder
 Nicholas Wilde
 Thomas Westerne
 Richard Young
 John Young

See also 
Charter of Incorporation for the Royal African Company, 1672, at British History Online:   (Accessed: 3 Mar 2022)

References 

British colonisation in Africa